The Pagoda of Cishou Temple, originally known as Yong'an Wanshou Pagoda, is a 16th-century stone and brick Chinese pagoda located in the Buddhist Cishou Temple in Balizhuang, Haidian District, Beijing.

Description
This octagonal-shaped pagoda is roughly 50 m (164 ft) tall, with elaborate ornamental carvings, thirteen tiers of eaves, and a small steeple. The Cishou Pagoda was built in 1576 during the Ming dynasty (1368–1644), commissioned by Empress Dowager Li during the reign of the Wanli Emperor (1572–1620). The Cishou Pagoda was modelled upon a similar pagoda at Tianning Temple outside Guang'anmen in Beijing. The style of eaves on the pagoda is similar to older Liao dynasty and Jin dynasty pagodas. Although the surrounding Cishou Temple has been destroyed, the original Ming pagoda of Cishou has remained unharmed except for noticeable weathering damage to the carved reliefs on its exterior facade.

The brick base of the pagoda is shaped as a sumeru pedestal and is decorated with relief carvings of the Buddha, lotus petals, and other designs. The upper portion of the pagoda features carved designs of Chinese musical instruments such as the guqin. Stylistic dougong supports—commonly found in wooden Chinese architecture—are carved in between the eaves of the pagoda.

See also

Chinese architecture
Pagoda

External links

Cishou Temple Pagoda at China.org.cn

Buddhist temples in Beijing
Chinese architectural history
Pagodas in China
Ming dynasty architecture
Cishou Temple pagoda
Religious buildings and structures completed in 1576